Ilya Yuryevich Leonov (born 21 December 1979 in Moscow) is a retired Russian beach soccer and former futsal player. From 2010 to 2018, he played for Lokomotiv Moscow, where for a time he served both as player and coach. After his retirement as a player he is coaching the Russia women's national beach soccer team, winning with them two Euro Beach Soccer Cups in a row, and continues coaching Lokomotiv Moscow.

He is Merited Master of Sports of Russia.

Career
Leonov made his first steps into football in the school "Timiryazevets". He debuted in professional sports for Sportakademklub Moscow. After three seasons, Leonov decided to switch to futsal by debuting for Poligran Moscow. Following two seasons in the premier league, that club gained entry to the highest national futsal league. The 2002/03 season was the last one for Poligran, after which it was abolished. Leonov went to the Leman-Payp Moscow, then he played for Yakutian Almaz-Alrosa. In the second-highest division from 2009 to 2010 he and his team won the trophy.

In 2005, Leonov discovered beach soccer. Between futsal seasons he participated on beach soccer tournaments. He quickly debuted for the national beach soccer team and considerably helped his team to progress. In 2009 and 2011 the Russians won the superfinal of the Euro Beach Soccer League, and soon won their first championship title. Leonov as captain received the Golden Ball award.

On 21 December 2012, Leonov was named Merited Master of Sports by the order of the Sports Minister.

Achievements
Some of Leonov's notable achievements:

As player

Futsal clubs
European Champions Cup:  2006
Club World Cup:  2005
Intercontinental Cup:  2005, 2006, 2007

Beach soccer clubs
Russian National Championship:  2008, 2009, 2010, 2011, 2012,  2013, 2015, 2016
Russian Cup:  2008, 2009, 2011, 2012, 2013,  2014
Russian Super Cup:  2011
Euro Winners Cup:  2013
Mundialito de Clubes:  2012

Beach soccer national team
FIFA Beach Soccer World Cup:  2011, 2013
Euro Beach Soccer Cup:  2005,  2010, 2012
 Euro Beach Soccer League:  2007, 2008,  2009,  2010  2011,  2012,  2013, 2014
Beach Soccer Intercontinental Cup:  2011, 2012,  2013, 2014,  2015

Individually
2011 season
FIFA Beach Soccer World Cup – Golden Ball
2012 season
Merited Master of Sports (21 December 2012)
2013 season
Euro Beach Soccer League, Stage 5 – MVP
Euro Beach Soccer League, Superfinal – MVP

As coach
Women's Euro Beach Soccer Cup:  2018, 2019

References

External links
Profile at Beach Soccer Russia 

Russian beach soccer players
1979 births
Living people
Sportspeople from Moscow
Russian men's futsal players
European Games gold medalists for Russia
Beach soccer players at the 2015 European Games
European Games medalists in beach soccer